İstanbul Başakşehir Futbol Kulübü is a Turkish professional football club based in the Başakşehir district of Istanbul. The club is better known simply as Başakşehir. The club was founded in 1990 as İstanbul Büyükşehir Belediyespor (Istanbul Metropolitan Municipality Sports Club). They first reached the highest level in Turkish Football in 2007–08. They play their home games at the Başakşehir Fatih Terim Stadium in Istanbul.

The club is one of eight Süper Lig teams based in Istanbul, along with Beşiktaş, Fatih Karagümrük, Fenerbahçe, Galatasaray, İstanbulspor, Kasımpaşa and Ümraniyespor. In the 2016–17 season, they participated in the Süper Lig, Turkish Cup and UEFA Europa League. In the 2017–18 season they reached the play-off round of the UEFA Champions League qualifying round. They won their first top flight title in the 2019–20 season.

History

The club is comparatively new relative to many of the other professional Turkish teams, having been established in 1990. The club's former name was ISKI Spor Kulübü and they were owned by the municipality's water distribution company. ISKI Spor Kulübü competed in the Regional Amateur Football League in the 1990–91 season and were promoted to the TFF Second League. After promotion, the club's name changed to İstanbul Büyükşehir Belediyesi Spor Kulübü (Turkish for Istanbul Metropolitan Municipality Sports Club). The club played in the TFF Second League until 1996, but after the 2006–07 season they were promoted to the Süper Lig. Finishing 12th in the 2007–08 season enabled them to remain in the Süper Lig for the 2007–08 season. In the 2009–10 season, the club finished the season in 6th place. In the 2012–13 season, the club finished 16th and relegated to the TFF First League. But it finished in the TFF First League as champions and made an immediate return to the top level in the 2013–14 season.

In 2014, the club was bought by new owners with ties to the ruling Justice and Development Party. Its name was changed in June 2014 to İstanbul Başakşehir Futbol Kulübü. During the following 2014–15 and 2015–16 seasons, the club finished in 4th place.

On 25 May 2015, İstanbul Başakşehir Futbol Kulübü signed a sponsorship agreement with "Medipol Eğitim ve Sağlık Grubu" (Medipol Education and Health Group) for four years and the team's name changed to Medipol Başakşehir Futbol Kulübü.

On 19 July 2020, Başakşehir were crowned champions of the Turkish Süper Lig for the first time in the club's history. They also became only the sixth club in the competition's history to win the league title and the fourth club from Istanbul to do so.

They won their first Champions League fixture on 4 November 2020 in a 2–1 home win over English side Manchester United.

Stadium

Before the name change İstanbul Başakşehir were playing their games at Atatürk Olympic Stadium but starting from the 2014–15 season they began to play their games at the Başakşehir Fatih Terim Stadium which on 26 July 2014 opened officially to public. The venue has a capacity of 17,800 spectators. It is the new home of İstanbul Başakşehir playing in the  Süper Lig.

Honours

Leagues
Süper Lig
 Winners (1): 2019–20
Runners-up: 2016–17, 2018–19
1. Lig
 Winners (1): 2013–14
2. Lig
 Winners (2): 1992–93, 1996–97

Cup
Turkish Cup
Runners-up: 2010–11, 2016–17
Turkish Super Cup
Runners-up: 2020

Past seasons

Domestic results

League affiliation
 Süper Lig: 2007–13, 2014–
 TFF First League: 1993–95, 1997–07, 2013–14
 TFF Second League: 1992–93, 1995–97

European history
Accurate as of 15 March 2023

Source: UEFA.comPld = Matches played; W = Matches won; D = Matches drawn; L = Matches lost; GF = Goals for; GA = Goals against; GD = Goal Difference.

UEFA ranking

Players

Current squad

Out on loan

Club officials

Board of Directors 

 Last updated: 6 November 2020
 Source:

Current Technical staff 

 Last updated: 3 October 2021
 Source:

Managers

Records

Most appearances 
Competitive, professional matches only.
Up to date as of 19 March 2023

Top goalscorers 
Competitive, professional matches only.
Up to date as of 19 March 2023

Kit suppliers and shirt sponsors

Club records
Biggest win: İstanbul Başakşehir 7–0 Turgutluspor (2020–21)
Biggest defeat: İstanbul Başakşehir 0–7 Galatasaray (2022–23)

Notes

References

External links

İstanbul Başakşehir on TFF.org

 İstanbul Başakşehir FK
1990 establishments in Turkey
Association football clubs established in 1990
Football clubs in Turkey
Sport in Istanbul
Süper Lig clubs
Sports teams in Istanbul